Paisley and Renfrewshire North is a constituency of the House of Commons of the Parliament of the United Kingdom. It was created for the 2005 general election, replacing most of Paisley North and Renfrewshire West.

Constituency Profile
The constituency covers the northern portion of Paisley, the smaller towns of Renfrew and Linwood, and rural villages such as Bishopton, Bridge of Weir and Houston.

Boundaries

The constituency includes the northern part of Paisley, plus the towns of 
 Renfrew
 Erskine
 Bishopton
 Langbank
 Bridge of Weir
 Houston
 Craigends
 Linwood
 Ralston
and also Glasgow Airport and Hillington Industrial Estate.

The northern boundary of the constituency is the River Clyde from Braehead in the east to Langbank in the west.

A map of the constituency can be found at the Election Maps site.

Members of Parliament

Elections

Elections in the 2010s

Elections in the 2000s 

This constituency was formed in 2005 from parts of the old Paisley North and Renfrewshire West constituencies.

References 
Specific

General

Westminster Parliamentary constituencies in Scotland
Constituencies of the Parliament of the United Kingdom established in 2005
Politics of Paisley, Renfrewshire
Politics of Renfrewshire
Erskine, Renfrewshire